Stephen Tong Tjong Eng (born 1940) is a Chinese Indonesian Reformed pastor, evangelist, teacher and musician. He heads the Reformed Evangelical Church of Indonesia, which houses the megachurch Messiah Cathedral, and is the largest  Christian Church building in Southeast Asia. He has preached in countries around the world, and guest lectured at theological seminaries and schools.

Early life 
Tong was born in 1940 in Xiamen, China, from Tong Pai Hu, a businessman whose family was highly regarded by the Qing government, and Tan Tjien Nio (Indonesian: Dorcas Tanjowati). He is the sixth of ten children, only one of whom was a girl. his father died when Stephen was 3; his family wealth had eroded during the years of Japanese imperialism. At that time, Tong's mother fostered their brothers and sister alone.

In 1949, he with his mother and siblings migrated to Surabaya, Indonesia, to find a better place of living during the Chinese Communist Revolution. He completed primary education at Min Guang Primary School and he graduated from Chung Hwa High School in 1958.  Though he had not graduated yet, he had been teaching as either assistant or formal teacher from 1957 till 1960 at Zhong Guo Nui Xue School and Yi Xing Night School.

When Tong was 15 years old, he had strong beliefs in communism, which he called "Karl Marx's dialectical materialism". He ascribed to Charles Darwin's theory of evolution, and had a deep hatred towards Christianity, which he regarded as "the foolish religion which came from the devilish West and has illogical teachings". However, he respected that his mother had a devoted spiritual life: "When I was small, the first words I'd hear in the morning were those of my mother while she prayed. She prayed for each of us children by name, and asked God to guide us.".

In 1957, his mother asked him to attend a Christian Youth Conference that was conducted by the Southeast Asia Bible Seminary (SEABS) (now , SAAT) in Malang in 1957.  On 9 January, the last day of the conference, when Andrew Gih gave a revival sermon, Tong became a Christian. He began to share the Gospel, and taught children in Christian schools. In 1960, he enrolled in SEABS, and later graduated with a Bachelor of Theology in 1964.  He then joined SEABS's faculty, and taught theology and philosophy classes from 1964 to 1988.

Ministry 
While he was a teacher at South East Asia Bible Seminary, Tong served as an evangelist at THKTKH (Min Nan: Tiong Hoa Kie Tok Kauw Hwee [中华基督教会]);, transliterated "Church of Christ The Lord", and travelled weekly between Malang and Surabaya.

Around at that time, he had tried leading some Gospel Rallies in various cities in Indonesia. Then since 1969, he received invitations to lead Gospel Rallies in various countries, including Europe, America, Australia, Japan, Hong Kong, Taiwan, Thailand, Vietnam, Philippines, Malaysia, Singapore, etc. It is especially for Chinese and Indonesian speakers. In 1974, he started to hold seminars in Surabaya to provide truthful doctrinal understanding for churches in Indonesia.

In 1978, he along with Jahja Ling established Stephen Tong Evangelistic Ministries International (STEMI). One of its goals is to equip people for full-time ministry. He preaches at cities across Southeast Asia.

In 1982, he received his ordination as pastor. He served at GKT ("Church of Christ The Lord"), then ministered in GKA ("Servant Christian Church"). He has conducted services in Mandarin and Indonesian, but some of his speaking engagements have been in Fujian and English.

Since then, he has guest lectured in Theology and delivered sermons in various prominent universities at the China Graduate School of Theology (Hong Kong), China Evangelical Seminary (Taiwan), Trinity Theological College (Singapore), Regent College (Canada), and universities in the United States, including: Westminster Theological Seminary, Harvard, MIT, Stanford, Yale, University of California Berkeley, University of Maryland, Columbia University, Cornell University, etc.

Since the GRII has found in 1989, his services have extended to many major cities in Indonesia, including Surabaya, Medan, Malang, Bandung, especially during the Christmas and Easter seasons. To maintain contact with the cities outside Jakarta, he established STEMI branch offices in each of the areas. He added offices in the United States and the European Union.

Since 2000, he travels weekly to around 5 countries (Indonesia, Singapore, Malaysia, Hong Kong, Taiwan) to serve for approximately 6000 audiences. In 2009, Ric Cannada, Chancellor of Reformed Theological Seminary, noted in his school's newsletter that Tong's weekly preaching schedule included "two Sunday services in Jakarta; every Sunday evening at two services in a church in Singapore; every Monday evening at a church in Kuala Lumpur, Malaysia; every Tuesday night at a church in Hong Kong; and every Wednesday night at a church in Taipei, Taiwan."

Reformed Evangelical Movement 
Tong observed that many churches have been influenced by worldly philosophy, and ones that were loyal to the genuine teaching of the Bible were rare. In 1984, he started the Reformed Evangelical Movement with the purpose of restoring the understanding of theology based on God's revelation in the Scripture and igniting people with zeal for evangelism. The movement is "aimed at meeting the challenge of the Charismatic movement as well as liberalism." He conducted theological seminars such as the Christian Faith Development Seminar (SPIK), to introduce Reformed theology to the people in Jakarta. His first seminar, "Faith and Religion", was attended by about 1,200 people. He would later adapt the seminars into books and multimedia, which he publishes in-house. The SPIK seminars have become the source material for the Indonesian Reformed Evangelical Institution (LRII), a seminary which Tong co-founded with pastors Caleb Tong and Yakub Susabda in 1986.

In 1986, Tong started the Evangelical Reformed High School for laymen in Surabaya. In 1987, he started a similar high school in Jakarta, and in 1990, he started one in Malang. The goal is to encourage Christian congregations from all denominations to study Reformed theology. He has served as a rector for these schools.

Reformed Evangelical Church of Indonesia 

Stephen Tong founded the Reformed Evangelical Church of Indonesia in 1989 to establish a church based on Reformed theology and congregations that are committed to evangelism. He is currently the Head of Synod. Although the church subscribes to the Reformed confessions, it also has its specific confessions of faith. In 2004, GRII had congregations in five Indonesian cities and has expanded to branch churches around the world in Asia, Australia, Germany, and North America.

Tong personally designed the Messiah Cathedral, whose proposal took 15 years to approve. Opening ceremonies took place on 18–20 September 2008, including a classical music concert and a dedication service. The building has  of space, and two auditoriums that seat up to 8,000 people. The building is also home to the Reformed Millennium Center of Indonesia (RMCI), which holds some of Tong's other projects and organizations.

Other institutions
Tong's (LRII) seminary has since been named Reformed Evangelical Seminary (STTRII). Yakub Susabda serves as its president and a teacher. The seminary offers an undergraduate degree in Theology, and master's degrees in Christian ministry, divinity, theology, and counseling. In 2008, STTRII moved to the Reformed Millennial Center (RMCI) in Jakarta. It has a relationship with Westminster Theological Seminary.

In 1996, he founded the Reformed Institute for Christianity and 21st Century in Washington DC. Its purpose is "to equip Christians for global evangelization in the 21st Century by training them in the areas of reformed theology, apologetics, evangelism, and the critical study of Eastern and Western cultures". It was renamed to the Reformed Institute of North America (RINA) in 2007, with locations throughout the United States and Canada.

in 1998, he established the Reformed Institute Jakarta. The school is headed by GRII pastor Benyamin Intan, and offers undergraduate degrees in Theology and Ecclesiastical Music, and master's degrees in Divinity, Evangelism, and Christian studies.

Its Reformed Ecclesiastical Faculty of Music was established in 2002; its goal is "to return all the glory to God through music at its best."

In 2000, Tong attended the inaugural meeting of the World Reformed Fellowship, whose purpose is to formalize the Reformed Confession of Faith in the 21st Century. In 2006, they created the statement of faith and appointed members for their Commission of Theology. Tong joined reformed theologians Gerald Bray, A. T. B. McGowan, Peter Jones, and Samuel Logan as members.

In 2006, Tong and Intan co-founded the think tank group, Reformed Center for Religion and Society (RCRS); its purpose is to promote the cultural mandate.

In 2008, Tong founded Sekolah Kristen Calvin (Calvin Christian School). Tong also founded Calvin Institute of Technology in 2018.

Theology and style 
According to his profile on STEMI, he "emphasizes on the importance of the Bible as the sole word of God and actively encourages evangelism", and believes that churches should follow the cultural mandate. His preaching style is influenced by Calvinist preachers George Whitfield and Charles Spurgeon.

Music and Arts 
Tong has composed music in Indonesian, Mandarin, and English. He occasionally conducts choirs and orchestras, and gives church talks about the appreciation of sacred music. He founded the Jakarta Oratorio Society in 1986, a choir that specializes in worship music.

During the development of the Messiah Cathedral, he contributed to the design of the Reformed Millennium Center of Indonesia (RMCI) and helped design some of other church buildings in Indonesia. In 2009, he opened the Aula Simfonia Jakarta concert hall in the RMCI; it holds 1,200 seats. He served as the music director for the Jakarta Simfonia Orchestra, along with artistic consultant Jahja Ling and Billy Kristanto. In 2011, he opened the Galeria Sophilia in the RMCI to display some of his and church members antiques for education.

Personal life 
Tong married Sulfie Lalujawati. They live in Jakarta, Indonesia. They have one son and three daughters. Their son David Tong was an MRII evangelist in Philadelphia, Pennsylvania, United States, and has been serving at GRII Karawaci, Tangerang since 6 January 2019. Their daughter Eunice works as the music director for Aula Simfonia Jakarta. Their youngest daughter Rebecca is a conductor and music director for Aula Simfonia Jakarta.

In addition to enjoying classical music from the Baroque period, Tong enjoys collecting watches and antiques.

Honors and awards
In 1985, Tong was awarded an honorary Doctor of Leadership in Christian Evangelism (DLCE) degree from the La Madrid International Academy of Leadership in Manila, Philippines

In 1992, pastor Philip Teng called him the "Billy Graham of the East" for his large-scale ministries in Southeast Asia.

In 2007, STEMI published the book God's Fiery Challenge for Our Time: Festschrift in Honor of Stephen Tong, the Founder and the Master Planner of Reformed Evangelical Movement: 50 Year Preaching the Word of God to regard him as "the True Evangelist of this Age".

In May 2008, he received an honorary Doctor of Divinity (DD) degree from the Westminster Theological Seminary in Glenside, Pennsylvania.

In 2011, Westminster Theological Seminary created an endowment for the Stephen Tong Chair of Reformed Theology. The professorship was given to Jeffry K. Jue, an associate professor in church history.

Bibliography 
Tong has written books based on his sermons and teachings.  Most of the books are published in-house by Momentum Publisher and are mostly available in Indonesian language. They are grouped by topic below.

 SPIK
Tong's books from the Christian Faith Development Seminar (SPIK); the number denotes SPIK conducted in Jakarta:

Seri Mimbar
Tong's books for the Reformed Evangelical Pulpit Series include:

Special Courses 
Additional teaching topics authored by Tong:

Gospel Rallies
Tong wrote these books for the STEMI rallies.

Devotionals, adopted from Momentum Fellowship in booklet size (no ISBN)

Others

Discography 
Tong has written songs for his worship services and STEMI gospel rallies. The songs are listed with the year and location when they were first performed:

Notes

References

Citations

Sources 
 Works cited

External links 
  
   – Tong's publisher
   
  
  
   
  
  
  , recent Seminary, official Tong's Seminary.
  , former Seminary, now held by Rev. Yakub B. Susabda, PhD, was Tong's former co-worker.
(in Indonesian) Sekolah Kristen Calvin, primary school and secondary school founded by Stephen Tong.
(in Indonesian) Calvin Institute of Technology, private university founded by Stephen Tong.

1940 births
Living people
Indonesian people of Chinese descent
Chinese Protestant missionaries
Indonesian Calvinist and Reformed Christians
Chinese emigrants to Indonesia
Chinese Calvinist and Reformed ministers
Christian revivalists
Hokkien people
Indonesian Hokkien people
Christian writers
People from Xiamen
20th-century Calvinist and Reformed theologians
21st-century Calvinist and Reformed theologians
Indonesian Christian missionaries
Protestant missionaries in Indonesia
Indonesian Christians